La Manga del Cura is a territory located in the Manabí Province belonging to the canton El Carmen in Ecuador.

History 
The first mention of La Manga del Cura comes from 1837, when a resident of Daule Canton, Nicolás Avilés, bought the area of the San Francisco de Peripa hill (that belonged to the area described) for 100 pesos. The name of the place honors the parish priest Luis María Pinto, who in 1928 opened, at the tip of a machete, a path (narrow path between palisades or fences, called in South America "manga") from Calceta to Pichincha, in order to reduce the hours of travel between both places.

Until 2015 it was considered an undefined area and therefore had no administrative or political membership to any canton or province of Ecuador and was in dispute by the four provinces bordering of Guayas, Manabí, Santo Domingo and Los Ríos. After multiple attempts to resolve this conflict, Guayas and Manabí persisted in the litigation, which led to a referendum held on September 27, 2015, through which by majority its inhabitants decided the accession of the territory to the province of Manabí. Finally, on April 11, 2017, the National Assembly of Ecuador in session 443 of the Plenary and in the second debate, approved the bill that established the territorial limit of La Manga del Cura, with 93 votes in favor and 5 abstentions. This resolution was published in the Supplement to the Official Register No. 994 on April 28, 2017.

References 

Geography of Manabí Province